Demos and Live Cuts Vol. II is the second compilation album by Michale Graves. The album features rare demos and songs written from 2002-2006, including original demo versions of Return To Earth material.

Track listings

External links
 Demos and Live Cuts Vol. I

Demo albums
2007 compilation albums
Horror punk compilation albums